CMH Lahore Medical College and Institute of Dentistry  is located on Abdur Rehman Road in the Cantonment neighborhood  of Lahore, Pakistan. It is a co-educational institution and is attached to Combined Military Hospital Lahore. It was established in 2006.

History
CMH Lahore Medical College and Institute of Dentistry was inaugurated by the former President and General Pervez Musharraf on 6 November 2006. It was the first ever venture of establishing a Medical College affiliated with Combined Military Hospital as its teaching facility.

The idea and conceptualisation was by Lt Gen Shafaat Ullah Shah, who was the Corps Commander Lahore at the time. The project from its conception to completion was accomplished in a record time of five months, by renovating abandoned buildings, as well as simultaneously laying the foundation for a new specialized college building. The Dental College was inaugurated in 2008.

Besides teaching facilities, it has separate hostels for girls and boys.

New block
A new block of CMH Lahore Medical and Institute of Dentistry was inaugurated on 16 January 2010 by the Prime Minister Of Pakistan Yousaf Raza Gillani and the Chief of Army Staff of the Pakistan Army General Ashfaq Parvez Kayani.

Dental education within the college has eradicated the need to hire public doctors.

Academics
The pioneer batch of Bachelor of Medicine Bachelor of Surgery (MBBS) students graduated in 2011.

The pioneer batch Bachelor of Dental Surgery (BDS) students graduated in 2012.

Affiliations
The college is affiliated with National University of Medical Sciences (NUMS) and is recognized by the Pakistan Medical and Dental Council. CMH Lahore Medical and Dental College is included in the AVICENNA Directory for medicine and International Medical Education Directory of FAIMER and ECFMG. The Institute of Dentistry is recognized by the Government of Pakistan, Ministry of Health vide its notification number F-3-46/2008-MER dated 4 March 2009. The college is under the administration of Pakistan Army.

Facilities

CMH Hospital
The CMH Lahore Hospital is a 1000-bed Class A hospital under the Pakistan Army. The hospital is recognised by College of Physicians and Surgeons Pakistan for College of Physicians & Surgeons Pakistan Part II / MCPS / DCPS training.

Neat and clean environment with advanced technology is certainly raising its standard.

Army Cardiac Centre
The Army Cardiac Centre is one of the most modern and well-equipped cardiac centers in Pakistan, operating state-of-the-art diagnostic, therapeutic and operative facilities. It was inaugurated on 29 March 2008 by President General Pervaiz Musharraf as CMH Lahore Cardiac Centre. The cardiac Centre  was built, furnished, equipped and made functional through the efforts of Corps Commander Lt Gen Shafaat Ullah Shah in a span of one year.

Both civil and military doctors practice in the Army cardiac centre.

Institute of Dentistry Dental Clinics for General Public
The Institute of Dentistry has dental clinics for the general public which provides dental healthcare so that students can learn under guided supervision of extremely capable faculty under subsidized rates.

References

External links
 CMH Lahore Medical and Dental College official website

Military dentistry
Universities and colleges in Lahore